Anthony Silva (born 1976) is an American politician who served as the 78th mayor of Stockton, California from 2013 until 2017.

Mayor of Stockton
Silva was elected mayor in the Stockton's 2012 mayoral election, unseating incumbent mayor Ann Johnston.

On May 15, 2014 Silva slept in a cardboard box outside to draw attention to the problem of homelessness.

On November 16, 2015, Silva gave God the key to the city of Stockton.

In December 2015 Silva announced a development plan for Stockton. The plan would build on the city's waterfront and create an airport. The plan also included the establishment of an ordinance prohibiting sagging, a fashion trend.

LGBT groups protested Silva's appointment of someone to a city planning commission. The person was said to be intolerant of diverse communities, including discriminating based on race and sexuality.

LGBT organizations and atheist groups protested Silva hosting civic meetings in a church that opposed LGBT rights.

While Mayor, Silva presented the idea of importing endangered Manatees to the Stockton Delta to help control the hyacinth problem. Biologists and specialists in the field roundly rejected his idea, stating many reasons for the plan not being a viable one, most notably that they are an endangered species that lives in tropical waters, unlike Stockton's frigid winter waters, and that even if all 5,000 manatees alive today were relocated to Stockton, they wouldn't even begin make a dent in the hyacinth problem.

Silva ran for re-election in 2016 but lost to Michael Tubbs, who received 70.4 percent of the vote.

Legal issues
On February 23, 2015 a 13-year-old boy was killed with a gun that was later found to have been registered to Silva. Silva said that the gun was stolen but that he had not yet reported the theft.

On August 4, 2016 Silva was arrested for providing alcohol to underage boys and recording them playing strip poker. Silva used to be President and Chief Executive Officer for the Stockton Kids Club, formerly known as the Boys & Girls Club of Stockton, a position he held for six years. The Club lost its official charter, which resulted in the name change, due to Silva's financial negligence. His official biography on the city's website states that "Mayor Silva has a passion for helping youth and, as a result, he sits on many local non-profit Board of Directors..."

On March 5, 2017 Silva was arrested at San Francisco International Airport. He was charged with grand theft, embezzlement, profiteering, misappropriation of public funds and money laundering related to his running of a local non-profit kids' club. In 2019 he pled guilty to one felony charge as part of a plea deal.

Electoral history

References

Mayors of Stockton, California
1974 births
Living people
California Republicans
21st-century American politicians